The Blood Is Strong is the first soundtrack album by folk rock band Capercaillie originally issued in 1988 and reissued in 1995 with six extra tracks by Survival Records. It was issued in North America by Valley Entertainment in 2000.

Track listing 
 "Aignish" (J A Morrison/Kennedy-Fraser)
 "The Hebrides"
 "Arrival Theme"
 "Cumha Do Dh'Uilleam Siosal"
 "Iona Theme"
 "Oh Mo Dhùthaich" (Trad. Arr. Capercaillie)
 "Calum's Road"
 "Callinish, Picts, Celts"
 "Fear a Bhàta" (Trad. Arr. Capercaillie)
 "Alasdair Mhic Cholla" (Trad. Arr. Capercaillie)
 "Dean Cadalan Sàmhach" (J MacRae)
 "Lordship of the Isles"
 "Grandfather Mountain"
 "Arrival Reprise"
 "An Ataireachd Ard"
 "Colum Cille"
 "'S Fhada Leam An Oidhche Gheamhraidh" (M McFarlane)
 "Downtown Toronto"
 "Maideanan Na h-Airidh" (Trad. Arr. Capercaillie)

Reissue track listing 
 "An Gille Ban" (Trad. Arr. Capercaillie)
 "Domhnall"
 "An t-Eilean Mu Thuath (The Isle to the North)" (John Macleod)
 "Fagail Bhernaraidh (Leaving Berneray)" (Macleod/Shaw)
 "Lorn Theme: Instrumental/Moladh Bhearnaraidh (In Praise of Berneray)" (Shaw/Duff)
 "Gun Teann Mi Ris Na Ruinn Tha Seo (Remembrance)" (MacLeod/Shaw)
 "Aignish"
 "Hebrides"
 "Arrival Theme"
 "Cumha Do Dh'uilleam Siosal"
 "Iona Theme"
 "Oh Mo Dhùthaich"
 "Calum's Road"
 "Callinish, Picts, Celts"
 "Fear a Bhàta"
 "Alasdair Mhic Cholla Ghasda"
 "Dean Cadalan Sàmhach"
 "Lordship of the Isles"
 "Grandfather Mountain"
 "Arrival Reprise"
 "Am Ataireachd Ard"
 "Columcille"
 "'s Fhada Leam an Oidhche Gheamhraidh"
 "Downtown Toronto"
 "Maideanan Na H-Airdidh"

Credits 
 Karen Matheson - Vocals
 Charlie McKerron - Fiddle
 John Saich - Bass, Guitar
 Manus Lunny - Bouzouki, Guitar
 Marc Duff - Whistles, Bodhran, Wind Synthesiser
 Donald Shaw - Accordion, Keyboards
 Anton Kirkpatrick - electric / acoustic guitar

References

External links 
 

Capercaillie (band) soundtracks
1988 albums
Scottish Gaelic music